Felin Fawr Works is a former slate works to Penrhyn Quarry Railway in Bethesda, Wales.  It dates back to 1803; This is when the first mill was supposedly built.  Felin Fawr closed in September 1965 with its current owners being Felin Fawr Cyf.  Most of the buildings, if not all of them, are listed.

History

Felin Fawr's earliest building dates back to 1803 with the Penrhyn Tramway incorporating from the Llandegai Tramway. which started in 1798 & opening in 1801.  The first building was the Western Slab Mill. Later buildings were added that included the Second Slab Mill opening in c.1830, a foundry, engineering facilities, a quarry railway and several slate mills. There are several other buildings on the site.

Present Day

In the present day Felin Fawr is currently owned by Felin Fawr Cyf with most of the buildings being rented out to a diverse range of local companies.

Layout

The site has a number of buildings as shown above. There was also a lot of train track laid out around the site. Felin Fawr Cyf has restored a fraction of this track.

Buildings and Structures

Waterwheels-On the site there are two waterwheels. One of these mills is thought to be the oldest industrial waterwheel in Wales. It is thought to be built in c.1846. This does not tie in with when the Slab Mill was built as no one knows what would have powered it. The only possibility is that there was another waterwheel on the site before.
Slab Mills-The first Slab Mill was built on the site in 1803 although many people, and documentary evidence, suggest it was built in 1865-6. This was because the belief WAS that it was built in 1803 though, as it says above, it may have been built in 1865-6.
Locomotive Shed-The Locomotive Shed is a slate slab-built shed. The loco shed is believed to date from shortly after the introduction of steam on the main line in December 1875 (when steam was introduced onto the line).

External links
 Felin Fawr Slate Works, Coflein
 Felin Fawr workshops, via History Points
 Felin Fawr Cyf Official Website
 Penrhyn Railway Official Website

Slate industry in Wales
Bethesda, Gwynedd
1803 establishments in Wales
British companies established in 1803